Joseph S. Simmons (né Chabriel; June 13, 1845 – July 24, 1901) was an American Major League Baseball player and manager from New York City. Simmons played three seasons in the National Association; the last year he was player-manager for the Keokuk Westerns, a team that would win just one game of the 13 that they played. He later became the manager for the Wilmington Quicksteps of the Eastern League. Late in the  season, after winning the Eastern League title, the Quicksteps joined the Union Association as a replacement team, but won only 2 of their 18 games.

Simmons died in Jersey City, New Jersey at the age of 56, and was buried at the Bayview – New York Bay Cemetery in Jersey City under his birth name of Chabriel.

References

External links

1845 births
1901 deaths
19th-century baseball players
Major League Baseball outfielders
Major League Baseball first basemen
Baseball player-managers
Rockford Forest Citys (NABBP) players
Chicago White Stockings (NABBP) players
Chicago White Stockings players
Cleveland Forest Citys players
Keokuk Westerns players
Burials at Bayview – New York Bay Cemetery
Minor league baseball managers
Rochester (minor league baseball) players
Baseball players from New York City